Daw's Castle (or Dart's Castle or Dane's Castle) is a sea cliff hillfort just west of Watchet, a harbour town in Somerset, England. It is a Scheduled Monument.

The name comes from Thomas Dawe, who owned castell field in 1537.

The fort may be of Iron Age origin, but was rebuilt and fortified as a burh by King Alfred, as part of his defense against Viking raids from the Bristol Channel around 878 AD. It would have been one of a chain of forts and coastal lookout posts, connected by the Herepath, or military road, which allowed Alfred to move his army along the coast, covering Viking movements at sea.

Excavations have revealed a first phase of defence with a mortared wall fronting an earth bank from this period. Then a second phase of defence in late 9th or early 10th centuries, also against Viking invaders.

In the Burghal Hidage of 919, nearby Watchet is attributed 513 hides, which converts to a defensive perimeter of 645 m. It is not clear whether this refers to the walls of the town, or of Daw's Castle high on the cliff above.

The Anglo-Saxon Chronicle records a Viking raid on Watchet in 914, but they were defeated with great slaughter ... so that few of them came away, except those only who swam out to the ships.

There was a plundering raid in 987, and another in 997, with much evil wrought in burning and manslaughter.

A Saxon mint was established at Watchet in 1035, and this was probably within the fort, rather than in the town below.

See also
List of hillforts and ancient settlements in Somerset
 Battle of Cynwit

References

 Somerset Historic Environment Record
 Daw's Castle (Site record 34164)
 Daw's Castle Saxon Burh (Site record 34162)
 Daw's Castle Excavation 1982 (Site record 15181)
 Daw's Castle Saxon Mint (Site record 34209)

Further reading

 A Field Guide to Somerset Archaeology, Lesley and Roy Adkins (1992) 
 The Archaeology of Somerset, Michael Aston and Ian Burrow (Eds) (1982) 

Anglo-Saxon sites in England
Hill forts in Somerset
Archaeological sites in Somerset
Scheduled monuments in West Somerset
Watchet